The Chinko River (or Shinko River) is a river of the Central African Republic. It is a right tributary of the Mbomou River.

Environment

The upper reaches of the Chinko river define the border between the Haute-Kotto and Haut-Mbomou prefectures.
For most of its length it flows in a SSW direction through Mbomou prefecture to its convergence with the Mbomou River.

The Chinko Nature Reserve is a protected area in the Chinko River basin.
It is managed by the nonprofit conservation organization African Parks as part of a fifty-year public–private partnership with the Ministry of Water, Forest, Hunting and Fishing.
African wild dogs have been documented in the south of the CAR in the Chinko/Mbari drainage basin in 2013.

History

Around 1800 Kassanga, a Bandia leader, founded a kingdom in the Shinko valley, later called the Rafai kingdom.
Kassanga was the great-grandfather of Sultan Rafai.
The Belgian officer Charles Kéthule de Ryove (1865–1903) was assigned to the Upper Uele expedition in August 1891.
In March 1892 he explored the region between the Mbomou and Shinko rivers.
He met Sultan Rafai, who declared his allegiance to the Congo Free State.
Kéthule de Ryove was resident at Rafai's court from 1892 to 1894.
He wrote in an 1895 article Le sultanat de Rafaï (Le Congo illustré) that almost all the inhabitants could speak Arabic, including the sultan, chiefs and soldiers. 
In 1894 the Belgian Léon Hanolet ascended the Mbari River, another tributary of the Bomu, while Théodore Nilis ascended the Chinko River.

Notes

Sources

 

Rivers of the Central African Republic